Silent Storm is a 2003 Australian documentary film written and directed by Peter Butt.

Synopsis 
From 1957 to 1978, scientists secretly removed bone samples from over 21,000 dead Australians as they searched for evidence of the deadly poison, Strontium 90 – a by-product of nuclear testing. Silent Storm reveals the story behind this astonishing case of officially sanctioned 'body-snatching'. Set against a backdrop of the Cold War, the saga follows celebrated scientist, Hedley Marston, as he attempts to blow the whistle on radioactive contamination and challenge official claims that British atomic tests posed no threat to the Australian people. Marston's findings are not only disputed, he is targeted as 'a scientist of counter-espionage interest'.

See also
Britain, Australia and the Bomb
List of films about nuclear issues
British nuclear tests at Maralinga
McClelland Royal Commission
Montebello Islands

External links 
 

2003 films
2003 in the environment
Australian documentary films
Documentary films about nuclear war and weapons
2003 documentary films
Body snatching
Films scored by Guy Gross
2000s English-language films